Motul may refer to:

 Motul (company), a French lubricant company
 Motul Municipality, Yucatán, Mexico
 Motul, Yucatán, a small city in Motul Municipality
 Motul de San José, Guatemalan archaeological site